Josiomorpha cathetozosta is a moth of the subfamily Arctiinae first described by Vitor Osmar Becker in 2013. It is found in Guatemala.

The length of the forewings is about 22 mm. The forewings are black with broad, yellow fascia from the base of the costa, across the cell. The hindwings are yellow with a broad black margin.

Etymology
The species name is derived from Greek cathetos (meaning perpendicular) and zoster (meaning belt).

References

Moths described in 2013
Arctiinae